Harm Kolthek Jr. was a Dutch printer, journalist, trade unionist and libertarian socialist politician. Kolthek led the syndicalist federation of trade unions, the National Labor Secretariat (NAS), from 1907 to 1913. He later founded and led the Socialist Party, sometimes called the "Kolthek party" after its founder, and served in the Netherlands House of Representatives for this party from 1918 to 1922.

Kolthek was born in 1872 in the village of Westerbroek, the son of Harm Kolthek Sr., factory worker, and Talligje van Eerden. At the age of twenty, he became involved in socialism after his later wife's brother was arrested and abused by hussars at a worker's revolt in Sappemeer; the brother-in-law succumbed to his injuries. In 1907, he became secretary of the NAS, which at the time was coping with financial troubles. Under Kolthek's leadership, the problems were overcome and membership of the NAS tripled. During World War I, Kolthek worked in France as war correspondent for De Telegraaf.

In 1918, Kolthek was elected party leader of the NAS's political arm, the Socialist Party (SP). He was elected to Parliament the same year on the SP's bill. He joined forces with Willy Kruyt of the League of Christian Socialists, but the cooperation did not last.

In 1925, Kolthek moved to Groningen, a city near his native village, for medical reasons: he had a disease of the eye and required treatment, which he found at the city's academic hospital. He returned to (local) politics in 1931, getting elected to the Groningen municipal council on behalf of the Rights and Freedom party, which he had founded. Both in 1935 and 1939, the party obtained five council seats. Kolthek's 1946 death spelled the end of this party.

References

1872 births
1946 deaths
Dutch socialists
Dutch trade unionists
Libertarian socialists
Members of the House of Representatives (Netherlands)
Municipal councillors of Groningen (city)
People from Hoogezand-Sappemeer
Syndicalists